The following India politicians switched parties via Operation Kamala while they were holding elected office.

Karnataka

2008

2019

See also 

 Anti-defection law (India)
 Operation Kamala
 Aaya Ram Gaya Ram

References 

Politics of India
Political controversies in India
Corruption in India
Bharatiya Janata Party
party switchers during Operation Kamala